Lovely Mary is a 1916 silent drama film directed by Edgar Jones (actor) and starring Mary Miles Minter. As with many of Minter's features, it is thought to be a lost film.

Plot  

As detailed in film magazines, the film is set in the Florida Everglades in 1901, at which point state law permitted citizens to employ convicts. Mary Lane (Minter) is the last female heir of a southern family, whose inheritance consists of a plot of land. Manning and Dempster, representatives of competing real estate firms, bid to buy this land. Dempster schemes to buy the land at a price far below its worth, and when this plot is discovered by a neighbour, Dempster shoots the neighbour and frames Manning for the crime. Manning is found guilty and sentenced to hard labour.

Mary, who has fallen in love with Manning and does not believe him to be guilty, convinces the governor to let her employ him on her estate. Meanwhile, a fight between Dempster and a witness to the murder, and a dying confession, result in the evidence of Manning's innocence. The film ends with Manning's release, his marriage to Mary, and the promise of their happy future on the plot of land, which they have decided to keep.

Cast
 Mary Miles Minter - Mary Lane
 Frank DeVernon - Claiborne Ogilvie Lane
 Russell Simpson - Peter Nelson
 Schuyler Ladd - Oscar Nelson
 Ferdinand Tidmarsh - Wade Dempster
 Myra Brooks - Aunt Becky
 Harry Blakemore - Uncle Joe
 Thomas Carrigan - Ronald Manning

References

External links

1916 films
Silent American drama films
American silent feature films
American black-and-white films
1916 drama films
Films shot in Florida
Metro Pictures films
Films directed by Edgar Jones
1910s American films